Lviv Danylo Halytskyi International Airport  is an international airport in Lviv, Ukraine. The airport is named after King Daniel of Galicia, the historical founder of the city in 1256 AD.

On 24 February 2022, Ukraine closed airspace to civilian flights due to the Russian invasion of Ukraine.

History

Early history 

Established in 1929 as Lwów-Skniłów Airport. Skniłów was the name of the neighbouring village which today is part of Lviv. Before the Second World War, it operated a domestic route to Warsaw and Krakow. In 1930, the international route to Bucharest was launched which was extended in 1931 to Sofia and Thessaloniki. In 1936, the above route was extended to Athens and Lydda.

The base was home to the:
 243rd Independent Mixed Aviation Regiment between 1960 and 1992 of the Soviet Air Forces.

Developments since 2010 
In 2010, the airport carried 481,900 passengers. In preparation for Euro 2012, Lviv International Airport has undergone a $200m expansion project. Lviv airport's new terminal building has an area of 34,000m² with a capacity of handling 1,000 passengers an hour. Of the $200m, it was expected that the Ukrainian government would provide $70m, including $14m in 2008, and $130m would come from private investors. The expansion project included a 700-meter extension of the existing runway and a new airport terminal capable of handling up to 2,000 passengers per hour (5.69 million passenger annually).

The airport used to be a focus city for Wizz Air Ukraine, which served four international routes to Italy (Naples, Bergamo, and Treviso) and Germany (Dortmund) until the airline was dissolved April 2015 (by contrast, routes from Kyiv International Airport continued after being taken over by the parent company). In January 2017, Wizz Air announced that it would be resuming flights to Lviv, initially with the introduction of a route to Wroclaw.

In March 2017, Ryanair announced that it would be launching seven routes to Lviv starting October 2017. These plans were scrapped in July after Ryanair's failure to reach an agreement with Boryspil and its subsequent decision to postpone entry into the Ukrainian market. Immediately the Ukrainian government put pressure on Boryspil and accused Ukraine International Airlines in sabotaging the agreement. This resulted in the continuation of talks with Ryanair and as of March 2018, it was announced that Ryanair would go on to open 10 new routes from Boryspil and 5 new routes from Lviv.

Facilities

Terminal A 
The airport has two terminals (1 and A), though only terminal A is currently in operation. Terminal A was opened in 2012. There are 29 check-in desks, of which nine are for domestic flights and the remaining twenty for international flights. It has nine gates, four of them equipped with jetbridges, and can handle up to 3,000 passengers per hour. Facilities at the airport also include four cafés and two duty-free shops, as well as two airport lounges, one in the domestic section and one in the international.

Terminal 1 
Opened in 1955, this was the airport's sole terminal until 2012, when terminal A was opened. It can handle 300 departing and 220 arriving passengers per hour. There had been tentative plans to use it for VIP passengers in the future. However, in June 2019, the terminal was re-opened for domestic flights, with future plans to move charter flights to the terminal as well.

Airlines and destinations

Regular and charter flights to Lviv before February 24, 2022.

Statistics

Ground transportation 

A dedicated express link bus to Lviv railway station runs every 90 minutes. The airport is also served by Lviv's public transport, specifically the bus route 48 and the trolleybus route 29, both of which terminate in the city centre. Taxis are also available at the airport, as well as car rental services.

Accidents and incidents
 The airfield was the site of the Sknyliv air show disaster in 2002, which killed 77.
On 4 October 2019, Ukraine Air Alliance Flight 4050, an Antonov An-12 crash-landed in a field close to the village of Sokilnyky  short of the runway of Lviv airport, killing at least five people. The Ukraine Air Alliance (Ukraine-Aeroalliance) plane ran out of fuel before a planned stopover at Lviv, en route from Vigo in Spain to Istanbul.
 On 18 March 2022, during the Russo-Ukrainian War, an aircraft-repair plant near the airport was hit by several Russian missiles.

See also
 Sknyliv air show disaster
 List of airports in Ukraine
 List of the busiest airports in Ukraine
 List of the busiest airports in Europe
 List of the busiest airports in the former USSR

References

External links

Official website
NOAA/NWS current weather observations
Current weather
ASN Accident history for UKLL
Flightradar Lviv Airport

Transport in Lviv
Airports in Ukraine
1929 establishments in Ukraine
Airports established in 1929